Felixstowe and Walton United Football Club is a football club based in Felixstowe, Suffolk, England.

History

Felixstowe Port & Town
Felixstowe F.C. were officially formed in 1890, although there are records of the club dating back to 1888. They were founder members of the Ipswich & District League in 1896. In 1900 they were relegated to Division Two of the league, and left at the end of the following season. They rejoined Division One in 1902 under the name Felixstowe Town and were league champions in 1910–11. They left the league again at the end of the following season, but returned in 1923. They won their second title in 1936–37.

After World War II the club merged with neighbours Walton United to form Felixstowe United, before reverting to the name Felixstowe Town in 1952. They won the league for a third time in 1957–58 and a fourth in 1964–65. In 1966 they switched to the Essex & Suffolk Border League. In 1966–67 they won the Suffolk Senior Cup with a 3–2 over Oulton Broad. They won it for a second time in 1974–75. After finishing as Essex & Suffolk Border League Premier Division runners-up in 1974–75 and 1975–76, the club joined the Eastern Counties League in 1976. In 1996 the club was renamed Felixstowe Port & Town.

Walton United
Walton United were established in 1895 and joined Division Two of the Ipswich & District League in 1901, but left after a single season. They joined the amateur version of the league in 1912. They won the league title in 1920–21 and in 1922 they were renamed Walton & Felixstowe, before reverting to their original name a year later. They won a second title in 1925–26. In 1947 they merged with Felixstowe Town, but were reformed in 1950 and rejoined the Ipswich & District League (later the Suffolk & Ipswich League). By 1979 they had dropped into Division Four, but after several promotions they returned to the top division in 1994. They won the Suffolk Senior Cup in 1998–99.

Merged club
The two clubs reunited in 2000 to establish the modern club, taking Port & Town's place in the Eastern Counties League Premier Division. However, at the end of the 2001–02 season they finished twenty-first out of twenty-two clubs, and were relegated to Division One. They returned to the Premier Division after as finishing runners-up in Division One in 2005–06. In 2016–17 the club were runners-up in the Premier Division. They were runners-up again the following season, earning promotion to the North Division of the Isthmian League.

Honours

Felixstowe Port & Town
Suffolk & Ipswich League
Champions 1910–11, 1936–37, 1957–58, 1964–65
Suffolk Senior Cup
Winners 1966–67, 1974–75

Walton United
Suffolk & Ipswich League
Champions 1920–21, 1925–26
Suffolk Senior Cup
Winners 1998–99

Records
Best FA Cup performance: Third qualifying round, 2016–17
Best FA Vase performance: Second round, 2011–12, 2016–17
Record attendance: 1,541 vs Coggeshall Town, Eastern Counties League Premier Division, 1 May 2018

See also
Felixstowe & Walton United F.C. players
Felixstowe & Walton United F.C. managers

References

External links
Official website

 
Football clubs in England
Football clubs in Suffolk
2000 establishments in England
Association football clubs established in 2000
Felixstowe
Suffolk and Ipswich Football League
Essex and Suffolk Border Football League
Eastern Counties Football League
Isthmian League